Jarjums is an Australian television series for preschoolers which screens on NITV. The series is dedicated to young and old alike. It provides fun and educational Indigenous and First Nations content from Australia and around the world. The series was originally screened on Imparja and the Nine Network.

See also
 List of Australian television series

References

External links
 Official website

Imparja Television original programming
National Indigenous Television original programming
Australian children's television series
2013 Australian television series debuts
English-language television shows